Alanna Broderick (born 18 August 1980) is a retired Jamaican tennis player.

Broderick won four doubles titles on the ITF Circuit. Her career-high WTA singles ranking is No. 724, which she reached on 1 November 2004. Her career high doubles ranking is world No. 364, which she reached on 15 November 2004.

Playing for Jamaica Fed Cup team, Broderick has a win–loss record of 17–12.

ITF finals

Doubles (4–2)

References

External links
 
 
 

1980 births
Living people
Jamaican female tennis players
Sportspeople from Kingston, Jamaica
People from Pembroke Pines, Florida
Central American and Caribbean Games bronze medalists for Jamaica
Central American and Caribbean Games medalists in tennis